That's Life is an American comedy-drama television series created by Diane Ruggiero, that was broadcast on CBS from October 1, 2000 to January 26, 2002.

Synopsis
The hour-long series follows the life of a young Italian-American woman (Lydia DeLucca, played by Heather Paige Kent), loosely based on Ms. Ruggiero's life, and her family in suburban New Jersey. The show was set in fictional Bellefield, ostensibly a play on the combination of Belleville and Bloomfield, two adjacent older working class suburbs on the north side of Newark, New Jersey.

In the first season, Frank DeLucca works as a toll collector on the New Jersey Turnpike, while Dolly is a housewife.  In the second season, Frank retires after suffering a heart attack on the job, and he and Dolly open a restaurant. Kevin Dillon played Paulie, Lydia's younger brother who was a young officer on the Bellefield Police Department who still lived at home. Debi Mazar played Jackie, Lydia's wise-cracking friend who owned a hair salon.  The show mixed family situations with situations focusing on Lydia's life as a young single woman looking for both love and stable career, and for more out of life than simply raising children.

The first season revolved around the fallout from Lydia's breaking off her engagement to Lou (Sonny Marinelli, who was written out after a few episodes), enrolling at a local university somewhat resembling nearby Montclair State University, and moving away from home for the first time. Most of the situations were light-hearted, but plots occasionally delved into darker subjects, including Paulie's struggle to resist the temptation to fall into corruption as a police officer. In the second season, Lydia finally selects a major to pursue a career in sports medicine. Her mother Dolly successfully ran for city council of Bellefield. Paulie started dating Plum (Danielle Harris), a classmate whom Lydia befriends in the first season, and marries her.

The show developed a small fan base and received generally positive critical response, but languished in the ratings, despite the presence of well-known names in its cast, in part because it aired during the Friday night death slot for much of its run. It was cancelled at the end of the second season with numerous unresolved plot lines, including the budding romance between Lydia and one of her professors.

Cast
Heather Paige Kent as Lydia DeLucca
Debi Mazar as Jackie O'Grady
Ellen Burstyn as Dolly DeLucca
Paul Sorvino as Frank DeLucca
Kevin Dillon as Paulie DeLucca
Danielle Harris as Plum Wilkinson (later: DeLucca)
Gregory Jbara as Jo Jo Regosi

Episodes

Season 1 (2000–01)

Season 2 (2001–02)

TV ratings
Highest rated: 12.1 million/9.1 household rating [series debut against Summer Olympics Closing Ceremony]
2000 to 2001: 
2001 to 2002: 6.9 million viewers

Awards and nominations

References

External links
 
 

CBS original programming
2000 American television series debuts
2002 American television series endings
2000s American comedy-drama television series
Serial drama television series
Television series by CBS Studios
Television shows set in New Jersey